Rhynchospora cephalotes is a member of the sedge family, Cyperaceae. It is a perennial herb, found throughout the tropics of Central and South America, from southern Mexico and western Cuba in the northern extreme to Bahia and Bolivia in the southern extreme.

References

External links

cephalotes
Flora of South America
Flora of Central America
Flora of Cuba
Plants described in 1762
Plants described in 1805
Taxa named by Carl Linnaeus